Kurt-Lee Arendse (born 17 June 1996) is a South African Springbok player for the South Africa National Team, where his regular position is wing or fullback, and a rugby union player for the Bulls in the United Rugby Championship

Career 
He attended Paulus Joubert Secondary School in Paarl, where he earned a selection into the ' sevens team that competed at the 2014 SARU Under-18 Sevens competition.

He was named as the MVP at the 2018 Varsity Cup Sevens tournament, and joined the South African Rugby Sevens Academy in December 2018. He was an unused replacement in the final, which South Africa won, beating France 21–12.

He represented Monaco rugby sevens during Supersevens 2020. The team also featured many other South Africans and ended 7th in the tournament.

In 2020, with no seven tournaments due to the COVID-19 pandemic, he joined the Pretoria Bulls franchise where he immediately made an impact.

International tries 

 As of 19 November 2022

Honours
 Sevens rugby tournament winner 2019 Canada Sevens, 2019 Singapore Sevens, 2019 Dubai Sevens, 2020 USA Sevens
 Super Rugby Unlocked winner 2020
 Currie Cup winner 2020–21
 United Rugby Championship runner-up 2021-22
 United Rugby Championship Player of the Month in South Africa for March 2022

References

External links
 

South African rugby union players
Living people
1996 births
Rugby union wings
South Africa international rugby sevens players
Universiade medalists in rugby sevens
Universiade silver medalists for South Africa
Medalists at the 2019 Summer Universiade
Bulls (rugby union) players
Blue Bulls players
Rugby sevens players at the 2020 Summer Olympics
Olympic rugby sevens players of South Africa
South Africa international rugby union players